American Pharaoh may refer to:

 American Pharaoh (documentary), a documentary about association football coach Bob Bradley
 , a triple-crown racehorse